Spanish postal codes were introduced on 1 July 1984, when the  introduced automated mail sorting. They consist of five numerical digits, where the first two digits, ranging 01 to 52, correspond either to one of the 50 provinces of Spain or to one of the two autonomous cities on the African coast.

Two-digit prefixes 

The first two digits of a Spanish postal code identify the province or autonomous city it belongs to. The numbers were assigned to the 50 provinces of Spain ordered alphabetically at the time of implementation. The official names of some of the provinces have since changed, either to the regional language version of the name (e.g. from the Spanish  to the Basque ) or to adopt the name of the autonomous community instead of the provincial capital (e.g. Santander to Cantabria). In these cases, the originally assigned code has been maintained, resulting in some exceptions to the alphabetical order. In addition, Ceuta and Melilla were originally included within the postal areas of Cádiz and Málaga respectively; in 1995 they were assigned their own codes and hence ended up at the end of the list.

The list below includes all 52 two-digit prefixes assigned to the 50 provinces and two autonomous cities. Included in brackets are the names of the provinces that were used for alphabetical sorting at the time of implementation, if different from the current name used in English.

 01 Álava
 02 Albacete
 03 Alicante
 04 Almería
 05 Ávila
 06 Badajoz
 07 Balearic Islands
 08 Barcelona
 09 Burgos
 10 Cáceres
 11 Cádiz
 12 Castellón
 13 Ciudad Real
 14 Córdoba
 15 A Coruña
 16 Cuenca
 17 Girona
 18 Granada
 19 Guadalajara
 20 Gipuzkoa
 21 Huelva
 22 Huesca
 23 Jaén
 24 León
 25 Lleida
 26 La Rioja
 27 Lugo
 28 Madrid
 29 Málaga
 30 Murcia
 31 Navarre
 32 Ourense
 33 Asturias
 34 Palencia
 35 Las Palmas
 36 Pontevedra
 37 Salamanca
 38 Santa Cruz de Tenerife
 39 Cantabria
 40 Segovia
 41 Seville
 42 Soria
 43 Tarragona
 44 Teruel
 45 Toledo
 46 Valencia
 47 Valladolid
 48 Biscay
 49 Zamora
 50 Zaragoza
 51 Ceuta
 52 Melilla

Following digits
The third digit of a Spanish postal code is used to identify major cities or basic itineraries. A zero denotes a provincial capital, e.g. San Sebastián, as capital of the province of Gipuzkoa, uses the postal code 200xx.

The fourth and fifth digits are used to identify delivery areas, route itineraries or rural link itineraries.

Some codes are reserved for special use at the province capital:
 070: official use by Correos
 071: to address state agencies at the given province
 080: P.O. boxes and mail lists

References

External links
Find a postcode (Spanish post office website)
Another postcode finder – displays results on a map
List of ZIP codes of Spanish municipalities
Search engine for postal codes in Spain

Spain
Spain
Postal system of Spain
Spain geography-related lists